Park Kwang-hyun is a Korean name consisting of the family name Park and the given name Kwang-hyun (Gwang-hyun). It may refer to:

 Park Kwang-hyun (footballer) (born 1967)
 Park Kwang-hyun (film director) (born 1969)
 Park Gwang-hyun (born 1977)